Harbeth may refer to:
 Harbeth Audio Limited, a British loudspeaker company that was founded 1977 and made a LS3/5A
 Harbeth Fu, former Hong Kong swimmer